The Arrows A21 was the car with which the Arrows Formula One team competed in the 2000 Formula One World Championship.

The A21 was a completely new design by Coughlan and Eghbal Hamidy, who had designed the very similar looking Stewart SF3. The A21 benefitted from the revised Supertec engine and an excellent aerodynamic package with a much lower centre of gravity over its predecessor. Work on the car started early as the team switched its focus from the aged A20 car. A major injection of sponsorship from cell phone company Orange helped fund further development throughout the season. Paul Stoddart's European Aviation also became sponsors, providing logistical and transportation support in addition to Stoddart's F3000 squad effectively becoming Arrows' junior team.

The car proved to be very promising after the catastrophic 1999 season, but was too unreliable to score more than a handful of points-scoring finishes. Breaking the lap record in pre-season testing at Barcelona confirmed the car's potential. De la Rosa looked set for podium finishes at Hockenheim and the A1-Ring, but lost time after a spin in the former and suffered a gearbox failure in the latter. Verstappen also produced a number of impressive performances, including a memorable drive through the field in changeable weather conditions in Canada. His season culminated in fourth place at Monza. The A21 was also noted for consistently having amongst the highest straight-line speed of any car in the 2000 season. Both Verstappen and De La Rosa enjoyed driving the car, and both enthused about how fast it was, while Verstappen conceded that it was not at its best on high downforce tracks.

Verstappen and De la Rosa enjoyed a good working relationship and the Dutchman was keen to remain with the team going forward.

During the season, the team was the focus of a television documentary show, Racing Arrows. The series featured 13 episodes which followed the progress of the team and drivers throughout the season and was broadcast by British channel ITV in 2001.

The team eventually finished seventh in the Constructors' Championship, with seven points.

Complete Formula One results
(key) (results in bold indicate pole position)

Notes

References

Arrows Formula One cars
2000 Formula One season cars